Jade Chow Wei Mun (also spelled Jade Chow or Jade Wei Mun Chow) (born 1957) is a Malaysian physician, and interested in skin and bone pathology. She is currently being employed by Newcastle University Medicine Malaysia as a Dean of Clinical Affairs. Her previous research has particularly focused on skin and bone pathology, where she has published several articles.

Career

She studied medicine in Ireland and pursued postgraduate studies in London, obtaining FRCPath and a PhD from the University of London. She was Senior Lecturer and Reader in histopathology at St George's, University of London for 26 years until 2014, and also served as associate dean of St George's. She is a Fellow of the Royal College of Pathologists, and Regional Specialist Advisor for Histopathology for South London. She returned to Malaysia in 2014 to join the International Medical University as Professor of Pathology and the Dean of Medical Sciences. She is currently being employed by Newcastle University Medicine Malaysia as a Dean of Clinical Affairs.

Selected publications

Books
 Jade Chow, John Patterson, Medical Sciences, Oxford University Press, 2012,

Articles

 Increased insulin-like growth factor I mRNA expression in rat osteocytes in response to mechanical stimulation, American Journal of Physiology, 1995, Vol. 268, no. E318-E327
 Nitric oxide is an early mediator of the increase in bone formation by mechanical stimulation, American Journal of Physiology, 1996, Vol. 270, no. E955-E960
 Indomethacin has distinct early and late actions on bone formation induced by mechanical stimulation, American Journal of Physiology, 1994, Vol. 267, no. E287-E292
 Role of Nitric Oxide and Prostaglandins in Mechanically Induced Bone Formation, Journal of Bone and Mineral Research, Volume 13, Issue 6, pages 1039–1044, June 1998
 Induction of bone formation in rat tail vertebrae by mechanical loading, Bone and Mineral, Volume 20, Issue 2, February 1993, Pages 167–178
 Osteocytic expression of mRNA for c-fos and IGF-I: an immediate early gene response to an osteogenic stimulus, American Journal of Physiology, 1996, Vol. 270, no. E937-E945
 Role for parathyroid hormone in mechanical responsiveness of rat bone, American Journal of Physiology, 1998, Vol. 274, no. E146-E154
 Characterization of osteogenic response to mechanical stimulation in cancellous bone of rat caudal vertebrae, American Journal of Physiology, 1993, Vol. 265, no. E340-E347
 Nitric Oxide Synthase Expression in Bone Cells, Bone, Volume 23, Issue 1, July 1998, Pages 1–6
 Mechanical Loading Stimulates Bone Formation by Reactivation of Bone Lining Cells in 13-Week-Old Rats, Journal of Bone and Mineral Research, Volume 13, Issue 11, pages 1760–1767, November 1998

References

Academic staff of the International Medical University
Academics of St George's, University of London
Malaysian women academics
1957 births
Living people